The Cutting Room is a music venue.
The Cutting Room or Cutting Room could also refer to:

Cutting Room (film), 2006 film-see Elizabeth Daily
The Cutting Room (film), 2015 British film
The Cutting Room (novel), 2002 Scottish novel
The Cutting Room (TV show), see List of programs broadcast by BiteTV

See also
The Cutting Room Floor (disambiguation)